The 26th District of the Iowa House of Representatives in the state of Iowa.

Current elected officials
Brooke Boden is the representative currently representing the district.

Past representatives
The district has previously been represented by:
 William P. Winkelman, 1971–1973
 Joan Miller Lipsky, 1975–1979
 Robert Max L. Johnson, 1979–1983
 John E. McIntee, 1983–1987
 Patricia Harper, 1987–1991
 Donald Hanson, 1991–1993
 Patricia Harper, 1993–1997
 William Dotzler, 1997–2003
 Polly Bukta, 2003–2011
 Mary Wolfe, 2011–2013
 Scott Ourth, 2013–2021
 Brooke Boden, 2021–2023
 Austin Harris, 2023–present

References

026